An agglomeration, or urban agglomeration, is an administrative division of Quebec at the local level that may group together a number of municipalities which were abolished as independent entities on 1 January 2002 but reconstituted on 1 January 2006.

Urban agglomerations have certain powers that would ordinarily be exercised by individual municipalities.

History
The 2000–06 municipal reorganization in Quebec proved to be controversial in several municipalities, and in the aftermath, several municipalities voted in a 2004 referendum to reverse their amalgamation. However the supralocal urban agglomeration level of government was retained over each formerly merged region.

Definition
The Act respecting the exercise of certain municipal powers in certain urban agglomerations defines the expression urban agglomeration as follows.

An urban agglomeration corresponds to the territory, as it exists on 17 December 2004, of Ville de Montréal, Ville de Québec, Ville de Longueuil, Ville de Mont-Laurier, Ville de La Tuque, Municipalité des Îles-de-la-Madeleine, Ville de Sainte-Agathe-des-Monts, Ville de Mont-Tremblant, Ville de Cookshire-Eaton, Ville de Rivière-Rouge or Ville de Sainte-Marguerite–Estérel.

One municipality in each agglomeration is known as the central municipality and has special status under the Act. The others are called related municipalities.

The Act defines the powers exercised by the agglomeration and those exercised by the reconstituted municipalities, known as agglomeration powers (compétences d'agglomération) and local powers (compétences de proximité).

Agglomeration councils

Agglomeration powers are exercised by agglomeration councils (conseils d'agglomération).

Agglomeration powers

These are defined by statute.
Many governmental functions are performed by the central city in each agglomeration; for example, the Montreal city police (SPVM) have jurisdiction in the neighboring communities.

Local powers 
A list of these can be found on the website  of the Ministère des Affaires municipales et régionales.

List of constituent municipalities

In each list, the legally designated central municipality appears first.

Urban agglomeration of Montreal
The Urban agglomeration of Montreal is administered by the Montreal Agglomeration Council.
Ville de Montréal
Ville de Baie-D'Urfé 
Ville de Beaconsfield 
Ville de Côte Saint-Luc 
Ville de Dollard-Des-Ormeaux 
Ville de Dorval
Ville de Hampstead 
Ville de Kirkland 
Ville de L'Île-Dorval 
Ville de Montréal-Est 
Ville de Montréal-Ouest 
Ville de Mont-Royal
Ville de Pointe-Claire 
Ville de Sainte-Anne-de-Bellevue 
Village de Senneville 
Ville de Westmount

Urban agglomeration of Quebec City
Ville de Québec 
Ville de L'Ancienne-Lorette 
Ville de Saint-Augustin-de-Desmaures

Urban agglomeration of Longueuil
Ville de Longueuil
Ville de Boucherville 
Ville de Brossard
Ville de Saint-Bruno-de-Montarville
Ville de Saint-Lambert

Urban agglomeration of Mont-Laurier
Ville de Mont-Laurier
Municipalité de Saint-Aimé-du-Lac-des-Îles

Urban agglomeration of La Tuque
Ville de La Tuque
Municipalité de La Bostonnais
Municipalité de Lac-Édouard

Urban agglomeration of Les Îles-de-la-Madeleine
Municipalité des Îles-de-la-Madeleine
Municipalité de Grosse-Île

Urban agglomeration of Sainte-Agathe-des-Monts
Ville de Sainte-Agathe-des-Monts
Municipalité d'Ivry-sur-le-Lac

Urban agglomeration of Mont-Tremblant
Ville de Mont-Tremblant
Municipalité de Lac-Tremblant-Nord

Urban agglomeration of Cookshire-Eaton
Ville de Cookshire-Eaton
Municipalité de Newport

Urban agglomeration of Rivière-Rouge
Ville de Rivière-Rouge 
Municipalité de La Macaza

Urban agglomeration of Sainte-Marguerite–Estérel
Ville de Sainte-Marguerite-du-Lac-Masson
Ville d'Estérel

See also
Local government in Quebec
Municipal reorganization in Quebec
Metropolitan Community (Quebec)

References

External links
Act respecting the exercise of certain municipal powers in certain urban agglomerations